Broome Regional Prison is an Australian prison in Broome, Western Australia. It is one of two prisons in Western Australia's Kimberley region.

In 2012 it was announced that the prison would be closed in 2015 following the opening of the West Kimberley Regional Prison in Derby, but this plan was shelved in 2015.

References 

Prisons in Western Australia
Broome, Western Australia
1894 establishments in Australia